Tebogo Mothusi (born 20 October 1977) is a Botswana footballer. Between 2003 and 2005, he played for the Botswana national football team.

External links

Association football midfielders
Botswana footballers
Botswana international footballers
1977 births
Living people